John Bluem (born 1953) is an American former soccer defender and most recently a coach for the Ohio State Buckeyes. Bluem played professionally in the North American Soccer League.  After retiring from playing, Bluem became a men's college soccer coach.

Player
Bluem attended Hartwick College, playing on the men's soccer team from 1972 to 1974. In 1975, he graduated with a Bachelor of Arts degree in history. He was inducted into the Hartwick Warrior, now the Hawks, Hall of Fame in 2002. That year, the Tampa Bay Rowdies selected Bluem in fourth round of the North American Soccer League draft. He played the 1975 NASL indoor season before playing two outdoor seasons with the Rowdies, winning the 1975 NASL championship with them.

Coach
In 1984, Bluem earned a master's degree in sports education from the University of Akron.  In 1991, he was hired as head coach of the Fresno State men's soccer team.  Over the next six seasons, he took the Bulldogs to four NCAA post-season tournaments and compiled an 86–27–12 record.  His best season came in 1996 when Fresno State went 17–5–1, won the first WAC title and finished the season ranked seventh in the nation.  In 1997, Bluem moved to Ohio State to coach the Buckeye's men's soccer team.  Since then, he has taken Ohio State to six NCAA post-season tournaments and won three Big Ten titles.  His greatest success came in the 2007 Division I Men's College Cup when Ohio State finished runner-up to Wake Forest.  Bluem announced his retirement from Ohio State on March 19, 2018.

Broadcasting
Bluem was the radio color analyst for Columbus Crew home games from 2007–2014.

References

External links
NASL stats
Ohio State: John Bluem
 Tampa Bay Rowdies: John Bluem

1953 births
University of Akron alumni
American soccer coaches
American soccer players
Fresno State Bulldogs men's soccer coaches
Hartwick Hawks men's soccer players
North American Soccer League (1968–1984) indoor players
North American Soccer League (1968–1984) players
Ohio State Buckeyes men's soccer coaches
Tampa Bay Rowdies draft picks
Tampa Bay Rowdies (1975–1993) players
Living people
Sportspeople from Wheeling, West Virginia
Soccer players from West Virginia
Association football midfielders